The African Men's Olympic Qualifiers was held to determine the three African national teams for under 23 that will participate at the 1992 Summer Olympics football tournament held in Barcelona.

First round

|}

Second round

Group 1

|}

Group 2

|}

Third round

Group 1

|}

Group 2

|}

Fourth round

|}

Morocco won 2–1 on aggregate and qualified for the 1992 Summer Olympics.

Ghana won 10–1 on aggregate and qualified for the 1992 Summer Olympics.

Egypt won 4–1 on aggregate and qualified for the 1992 Summer Olympics.

References 

Football qualification for the 1992 Summer Olympics
Football at the Summer Olympics – Men's African Qualifiers